Phloeostichidae is a family of beetles in the superfamily Cucujoidea. They are typically found under the bark of dead trees. Larvae have been found to consume plant tissue and some fungus, while the adults appear to be exclusively fungivores. The family contains four extant genera, Phloeostichus is native to the Palearctic, Rhopalobrachium is native to central-southern South America and eastern Australia, Hymaea is native to southeastern Australia, and Bunyastichus is found in Tasmania.

Genera
 Bunyastichus Leschen, Lawrence & Ślipiński, 2005
 Phloeostichus Redtenbacher, 1842
 Rhopalobrachium Boheman, 1858
 Hymaea Pascoe, 1869
†Pleuroceratos Poinar and Kirejtshuk 2008 Burmese amber, Myanmar, Late Cretaceous (Cenomanian)

References

External links

 
 

Cucujoidea
Cucujoidea families